Menahem Koretski is an Israeli former footballer who former works as the manager of Ironi Kiryat Shmona.

Club career 
Koretski began his playing career as a goalkeeper in the youth setup of Shimshon Tel Aviv, and later had transferred to Beitar Tel Aviv. In 2000, Koretski moved to Maccabi Netanya and played as a second goalkeeper. He was also the second goalkeeper in Bnei Yehuda. In 2004, Koretski moved to Ironi Nir Ramat Hasharon, and for the first time in his career he got an active role and became the captain and the first goalkeeper of Ramat Hasharon. In 2010, he retired from professional football.

Managerial career 
After Koretski's retirement from football, he was appointed as a team delegate of Hapoel Ramat Hasharon, and later began serving as assistant coach. In the 2012–13 season, Koretski was appointed as head coach in joint with Benny Tabak. They both led the team to a very good performance. Few weeks before the end of the season, he was fired, after a conflict with some key players.

At the end of the season, Koretski was appointed as head coach of Hapoel Ra'anana and led the team to a promotion to Ligat Ha'Al. Two games before the end of the season, his team secured one more season in the Premier League.

Before the 2014–15 season, Koretski was appointed as head coach for Beitar Jerusalem, and was fired on 27 January 2015. One week later, Koretski was appointed as head coach for Hapoel Petah Tikva, and at the end of the season they were relegated to Liga Leumit. In January 2016, while Hapoel Petah Tikva were ranked first in Liga Leumit, Koretski decided to move to coach Maccabi Netanya, while Netanya entered a process of liquidation and were ranked 16th in Ligat Ha'Al. On 25 March he was fired.

In 2015-16, he returned to a second term in Hapoel Ramat Hasharon, but resigned later in November.

References
 
 

1974 births
Living people
Israeli Jews
Israeli footballers
Footballers from Tel Aviv
Shimshon Tel Aviv F.C. players
Beitar Tel Aviv F.C. players
Maccabi Netanya F.C. players
Bnei Yehuda Tel Aviv F.C. players
Hapoel Nir Ramat HaSharon F.C. players
Liga Leumit players
Israeli Premier League players
Israeli football managers
Israeli Premier League managers
Hapoel Nir Ramat HaSharon F.C. managers
Hapoel Ra'anana A.F.C. managers
Beitar Jerusalem F.C. managers
Hapoel Petah Tikva F.C. managers
Maccabi Netanya F.C. managers
Hapoel Tel Aviv F.C. managers
Hapoel Rishon LeZion F.C. managers
Hapoel Hadera F.C. managers
Hapoel Ironi Kiryat Shmona F.C. managers
Association football goalkeepers